Devran Ayhan (born March 25, 1978 in Batman, Turkey) is a Turkish football player. He most recently played for FK Qarabağ in Azerbaijan.

Devran played in 45 Azerbaijan Premier League games for Khazar Lankaran before mutually agreeing to terminate his contract in the summer of 2010, after playing in Khazar Lankaran's two UEFA Europa League games against Olimpia of Moldova.

He had previously played for Gebzespor, B. Petrolspor, Çaykur Rizespor, Gaziantepspor, Kayseri Erciyesspor, Ankaraspor and Ankaragücü in Turkey

Career statistics

References

1978 births
Living people
Turkish footballers
MKE Ankaragücü footballers
Ankaraspor footballers
Çaykur Rizespor footballers
Gaziantepspor footballers
Kayserispor footballers
Sivasspor footballers
Turkish expatriate footballers
Süper Lig players
Gebzespor footballers
Expatriate footballers in Azerbaijan
Khazar Lankaran FK players
Qarabağ FK players
Batman Petrolspor footballers
Turkish expatriate sportspeople in Azerbaijan
Kurdish sportspeople
Association football midfielders